Estelle Beauchamp is a Canadian educator and writer.

She was born in Montreal, where she worked as a language teacher. Beauchamp moved to Ottawa in 1974. She later moved to Sudbury.

Works 
 Les Mémoires de Christine Marshall (Prise de parole, 1995)
 La Vie empruntée (Prise de parole, 1998)
 Les Enfants de l'été (Prise de parole, 2004) — received the Prix Émile-Olivier
 Un souffle venu de loin (Prise de parole, 2010) — received the Prix du livre d'Ottawa and the Trillium Book Award

References 

Year of birth missing (living people)
Living people
Canadian novelists in French
Canadian women novelists
Writers from Montreal
20th-century Canadian novelists
21st-century Canadian novelists
Writers from Greater Sudbury
21st-century Canadian women writers
20th-century Canadian women writers